Ermete Stampa (died 1526) was a Roman Catholic prelate who served as Bishop-elect of Novara (1525–1526).

Biography
Ermete Stampa was born in Milan, Italy.
On 20 December 1525, Ermete Stampa was appointed during the papacy of Pope Clement VII as Bishop of Novara.
He died before he was consecrated in 1526.

References

External links and additional sources
 (for Chronology of Bishops) 
 (for Chronology of Bishops) 

16th-century Italian Roman Catholic bishops
Bishops appointed by Pope Clement VII
1526 deaths